Gavriil Kondratievich Malish (March 25, 1907, in Kitaygorodka, Ekaterinoslav Province, Ukraine, Russian Empire – October 25, 1998, in Saint Petersburg, Russian Federation) was a Soviet, Russian painter, watercolorist, and graphic artist, lived and worked in Saint Petersburg, regarded as one of the brightest representatives of the Leningrad school of painting, most famous for his decorative still lifes and landscapes.

Biography 
Gavriil Kondratievich Malish was born March 25, 1907, in Kitaygorodka village, near Ekaterinoslav, Ukraine, Russian Empire.

In 1934 Gavriil Malish graduated from Odessa Art Institute, where he studied of A. Gaush and T. Fraermann. Since 1935 he lived and worked in Leningrad.

Since 1954 Gavriil Malish has participated in Art Exhibitions. He painted landscapes, still lifes, genre paintings, worked in oil painting, watercolors, and pastel. The most known as master of watercolors. Personol exhibition of Gavriil Malish were in Leningrad (1975, 1976, 1977, 1985, 1988), Saint Petersburg (1996, 1997), and Stockholm (1991).

The leading place in the Art of Gavriil Malish takes a lyrical landscape and decorative still life. The untiring search for the artist in the field of colors predetermined his address to the decorative painting, to the synthesis of colors, where dominated his favorite light-blue and blue, lilac, cherry and violet hues, providing major sounding painting.

Gavriil Malish almost always has painted his works from memory, by notion, so, they are distinguished by special emotional excitement, saturation and color purity.

Gavriil Malish was a member of the Saint Petersburg Union of Artists (before 1992 - Leningrad branch of Union of Artists of Russian Federation) since 1955.

Gavriil Kondratievich Malish died on October 25, 1998 in Saint Petersburg. His painting and watercolors reside in State Russian Museum, in Art museums and private collections in Russia, France, Sweden, Norway, England, USA, China, Japan, and other countries.

See also 
 Leningrad School of Painting
 List of Russian artists
 List of 20th-century Russian painters
 List of painters of Saint Petersburg Union of Artists
 List of the Russian Landscape painters
 Saint Petersburg Union of Artists

References

Sources 
 Gavriil Malish. Painting. - Saint Petersburg: Ikar Publishing, 1994.
 Sergei V. Ivanov. Unknown Socialist Realism. The Leningrad School. - Saint Petersburg: NP-Print Edition, 2007. – pp. 24, 364, 390-397, 399, 400, 403, 405, 407, 439, 443, 445. , .

1907 births
1998 deaths
20th-century Russian painters
Russian male painters
Soviet painters
Russian watercolorists
Leningrad School artists
Members of the Leningrad Union of Artists
Socialist realist artists
Landscape artists
20th-century Russian male artists